Zhang Tianxin (born 10 September 1998) is a Chinese Paralympic archer. He won the gold medal in the mixed team W1 event at the 2020 Summer Paralympics held in Tokyo, Japan.

References 

Living people
1998 births
Chinese male archers
Paralympic archers of China
Paralympic gold medalists for China
Paralympic medalists in archery
Archers at the 2020 Summer Paralympics
Medalists at the 2020 Summer Paralympics
Place of birth missing (living people)
21st-century Chinese people